Amir Khan Muttaqi is an Afghan Taliban politician serving as acting Minister of Foreign Affairs of the Islamic Emirate of Afghanistan since 7 September 2021. He was also a member of the negotiation team in the Qatar office.

Early life and education 
Khan was born on 26 February 1971 in a village of the Helmand Province, his family's roots being in the Paktia Province, getting his primary education in a local school and mosque but because of the communist Saur Revolution he had to move with his family to neighboring Pakistan, where he was enrolled in a refugees’ madrasa and studied subjects such as Arabic grammar, logic, rhetoric, jurisprudence, hadith and Qur’anic exegesis.

He continued his higher Islamic studies at the Darul Uloom Haqqania, a seminary in Pakistan's Khyber Pakhtunkhwa province from which many other influential Talibans graduated.

Political career 

He was initially part of Maulvi Mohammad Nabi Mohammadi's group during the Afghan jihad but later joined the Taliban movement when it emerged.

Khan served as Minister of Information and Culture and as a representative of the 1996–2001 Taliban government in United Nations-led talks. During that time, a pro-Taliban source says that his "innovative activities" led to "a systematic jihadist publication apparatus against the enemy’s widespread media aggression."

On 17 August 2021, just after the fall of Kabul to the Taliban, he was reported to be in Kabul talking to non-Taliban politicians such as Abdullah Abdullah and Hamid Karzai about forming a government. Taliban forces took control of Afghanistan's capital city of Kabul on 15 August 2021 during a military offensive against the Afghan government that had begun in May 2021.

On 7 September 2021, the Taliban announced the first members of a new "acting" government, three weeks after coming to full power with the takeover of Kabul on 15 August. Amir Khan Muttaqi was appointed as Afghanistan's acting foreign minister.

In December 2021, Amir Khan Muttaqi attended a session of the Organisation of Islamic Cooperation Council of foreign ministers as Afghanistan delegate. The session were attended by delegations from 57 nations with China, Russia, and United States of America as guest delegations. Amir Khan discussed with Pakistan prime minister, Imran Khan, regarding the threat of ISIS in the Afghanistan-Pakistan border region.

Writings
In 2004 he wrote a book which was banned by the Taliban leadership, which thought some of its information could not be aired publicly.

See also
 Din Mohammad Hanif
 Abdul Latif Mansur

References

Living people
1971 births
Taliban leaders
Taliban government ministers of Afghanistan
People from Helmand Province
Darul Uloom Haqqania alumni
Foreign ministers of Afghanistan